Hawthorne Nevada Airlines Flight 708 was a domestic non-scheduled passenger flight between Hawthorne Industrial Airport, Nevada (HTH) and Hollywood-Burbank Airport, California (BUR/KBUR) that crashed into terrain near the tallest mountain in the contiguous United States, Mount Whitney, near Lone Pine, on February 18, 1969, killing all 35 passengers and crew on board.

History of flight
The aircraft, a Douglas DC-3, was operating on a visual flight rules plan. The crew consisted of Captain Fred Hall (43), and first officer Raymond Hamer (41), and one flight attendant, Patricia Nannes (21). It departed at 3:50 A.M. PST and last contact was made at 4:06 A.M. when the flight spoke with the Tonopah Flight Service Station. One hour later, at 5:10 A.M., the plane hit a sheer cliff face north of Mount Whitney, near Tulainyo Lake at 11,770 feet (3,558 m). The main body of the wreckage then slid down the cliff and stopped some 500 feet (152 m) back from the cliff, where it caught fire. All 32 passengers and 3 crew members were killed.

Search and rescue operation
Extensive searches from air and ground were launched after the aircraft went missing, but snow, low clouds, and mountainous terrain hampered the search. The aircraft was finally located on August 8, 1969. The delay likely had no impact on the lack of survivors, as it is thought that all on board died on impact.

Investigation
The National Transportation Safety Board launched an extensive investigation upon the location of the wreckage. Its conclusions were as follows:
The accident was caused by the deviation from the prescribed route of flight, as authorized in the company's FAA-approved operations specifications, resulting in the aircraft being operated under IFR weather conditions, in high mountainous terrain, in an area where there was a lack of radio navigation aids. The weather was also a contributing factor.

References

NTSB Report (PDF), ntsb.gov   (airdisaster.com) 
NTSB Summary

External links
Transcribed AP and UPI news articles from 1969 gendisasters.com - includes names of those on board
Brief history of Hawthorne Nevada Airlines zoggavia.com - (later Nevada Airlines)

1969 in California
Airliner accidents and incidents involving controlled flight into terrain
Airliner accidents and incidents caused by weather
Accidents and incidents involving the Douglas DC-3
Aviation accidents and incidents in the United States in 1969
Airliner accidents and incidents caused by pilot error
Airliner accidents and incidents in California
Hawthorne Nevada Airlines accidents and incidents
History of Inyo County, California
February 1969 events in the United States